Chiswick Investments v Pevats [1990] 1 NZLR 169 is a cited New Zealand case regarding mistake.

Background
Pevats, an external accountant, was the company secretary and nominal shareholder (1 share) in a company called Topp Engineering Limited. One day, the director of the company, Mr Allan Hebdon visited his firms accountancy firm, asking him to witness a loan agreement between the company and the Development Finance Corporation.

Pevats applied the company seal and signed as a witness of the seal.

At this stage, Pevats informed Hebdon, that he was signing merely as a witness, and in no way was he agreeing to give a personal guarantee for the loan. Pevat also signed in the shareholder section.

It was later discovered there was a personal guarantee in the loan contract, which was rather unfortunate for Pevast, as the company defaulted on the loan, and Chiswick Investments, whom had been assigned the loan from the DFC, sued Pevat personally for repayment of the loan under the shareholder guarantee.

Pevats pleaded mistake and non est factum.

Held
In a seemingly conflicting ruling, the Court ruled that there was no unilateral mistake here, so the personal guarantee was deemed legally enforceable against Pevats. However, it held that Pevats was not negligent in signing the loan agreement, as he innocently thought he was merely witnessing the company seal, making his plea of Non Est Factum successful here.

References

High Court of New Zealand cases
1989 in New Zealand law
1989 in case law
New Zealand contract case law